Gravity is an isometric game for the Amiga and Atari ST published by Image Works in 1991. It combines action and strategy elements in a science fiction setting.

References

External links
 Gravity at Lemon Amiga 
 Gravity at Atari Mania

1990 video games
Amiga games
Atari ST games
Image Works games
Single-player video games
Strategy video games
Video games developed in the United Kingdom
Video games with isometric graphics